Peter Bieri (born 23 June 1944), better known by his pseudonym, Pascal Mercier, is a Swiss writer and philosopher.

Academic background
Bieri studied philosophy, English studies and Indian studies in both London and Heidelberg. He took his doctoral degree in Heidelberg in 1971 after studies with Dieter Henrich and Ernst Tugendhat on the philosophy of time, with reference to the work of J. M. E. McTaggart. After the conferral of his doctorate, Bieri followed an academic career at the University of California, Berkeley, Harvard University, the Institute for Advanced Study, Berlin and the Van Leer Jerusalem Institute. In 1983 he started work at the University of Bielefeld and later he worked as a scientific assistant at the Philosophical Seminar at University of Heidelberg.

Bieri co-founded the research unit for Cognition and Brain studies at the German Research Foundation. The focuses of his research were the philosophy of mind, epistemology, and ethics. From 1990 to 1993, he was a professor of the history of philosophy at the University of Marburg; from 1993 he taught philosophy at the Free University of Berlin while holding the chair of analytic philosophy, succeeding his mentor, Ernst Tugendhat.

In 2007 he retired early, disillusioned by academic life and condemning what he saw as the rise of managerialism ("Eine Diktatur der Geschäftigkeit") and decline in respect for academic work.

Pseudonym and work as a writer 
As a writer, Bieri uses the pseudonym Pascal Mercier, made up of the surnames of the two French philosophers Blaise Pascal and Louis-Sébastien Mercier. Martin Halter, in Frankfurter Allgemeine Zeitung, criticized Bieri's attempt "to dress up the trite man from Bern in a French philosopher's lace jabot" as a pretentious mannerism. Peter Bieri has published five novels to date. Reviewers have identified “heart, woe and a lot of fate” as “his recipe for success” which Bieri, aiming at “wellness literature”, applies in each of his books with little variation.

Awards and recognition 
 Lichtenberg Medal 2006
 Marie-Luise-Kaschnitz Prize 2006
 Honorary Doctorate University of Lucerne 2010

Works

Philosophical works 
 Peter Bieri: Das Handwerk der Freiheit. Hanser, Munich 2001. 
 Peter Bieri: Eine Art zu Leben. Hanser, 2013. 
A full list of his philosophical works may be found on Wikipedia's German pages.

Novels 
 Pascal Mercier: Perlmanns Schweigen, English Perlmann's Silence. Albrecht Knaus, Munich 1995. 
 Pascal Mercier: Der Klavierstimmer. Albrecht Knaus, Munich 1998. 
 Pascal Mercier: Nachtzug nach Lissabon, English Night Train to Lisbon. Hanser, Munich 2004. , English 
 Pascal Mercier: Lea (Novelle). Hanser, Munich 2007. , English 
 Pascal Mercier: Das Gewicht der Worte. Hanser, Munich 2020.

References 

1944 births
Living people
Swiss philosophers
Analytic philosophers
20th-century pseudonymous writers
21st-century pseudonymous writers
Swiss writers
Swiss male novelists
Members of the Göttingen Academy of Sciences and Humanities